Gnomedex was a single-track technology conference hosted by Chris Pirillo, the owner of Lockergnome, LLC  and was produced by Chris Pirillo and his staff at Lockergnome.  Pirillo was the co-host of the show Call For Help on the former cable television channel TechTV.  Gnomedex started as an outgrowth of Pirillo's technology newsletters, IRC channel and web site.  The conference name is a satirical portmanteau of Pirillo's Lockergnome and the now-defunct Comdex technology trade show, which was a massive and influential annual event at the time of the first Gnomedex conference.

Gnomedex has grown into a conference exploring new and emerging technologies with influencers, entrepreneurs and tech enthusiasts as the primary audience.  It bills itself as the crossroads between producers and observers, between users and developers.  The conference format is meant to serve the needs of the attendees, many of whom are prolific bloggers and podcasters.

The first Gnomedex took place in October 2001 in Des Moines, Iowa, while the tenth Gnomedex took place in August 2010 in Seattle, Washington.  Gnomedex organizer Chris Pirillo announced that due to the difficulties in operating such events, that the tenth was likely to be the last Gnomedex unless additional backing and resources were brought forward to help spread the administrative and organizational overhead. A Gnomedex stage was included in the first Seattle Interactive Conference in November 2011 after Jake Ludington reportedly convinced Chris Pirillo to continue the event. In March 2015, Chris Pirillo announced that Gnomedex will be making a return sometime in 2015.

History

2001 
The first Gnomedex was held Friday, October 12, 2001 through Sunday, October 14, 2001 in Des Moines, Iowa.  Originally scheduled for the weekend after 9/11, it was postponed for a month to allow people to adjust their travel plans.  Despite the uncertainty, nearly 200 people attended from all over the United States, Canada and Europe.  The keynote was delivered by Steve Gibson, president of Gibson Research Corp. Presentations included:

 David Lawrence on the future of the music industry
 Userland Software employee Robert Scoble discussing OPML and RSS technologies.
 Derek Brown from Microsoft's Mobility Team demonstrating a Pocket PC-powered phone (technology which had just launched).
 Mark Thompson, freeware developer for AnalogX
 Mike Elgan, technology writer and editorial consultant
 Steve Kiene of eSellerate

David Lawrence also made a live broadcast of his radio show Online Tonight from Gnomedex.

Sponsorship was by several companies, including SnapStream and Microsoft.

2002 
Gnomedex 2.0 occurred on Friday, August 23 through Saturday, August 24, 2002 in Des Moines, Iowa at the Downtown Marriott.  The keynote was delivered by Leo Laporte, formerly with TechTV.  The speaker list included:

 Evan Willams from Blogger.com
 Phil "Pud" Kaplan, creator of FuckedCompany.com
 Ed Ross, founder of PC Talent
 Doc Searls
 Beth Goza
 Steve Gibson
 Mark Thompson of Analog X
 David Lawrence

Microsoft was the banner sponsor.

2003 
Gnomedex 3.0 was held in Des Moines, Iowa on July 25  and 26 2003.

Jennifer Staack was crowned Ms. Gnomedex 2003.

Beth Goza and Kevin Unangst from Microsoft presented on Digital Media in Microsoft Windows.

Speakers included:
John C. Dvorak, columnist with PC Magazine
Dan Gillmor, then with the San Jose Mercury News
Rob Malda, operator of the Slashdot technology news web site
Nelson Minar from Google
 Jim Louderback of Ziff-Davis Media
 Amir Majidimehr of Microsoft Digital Media
Tim O'Reilly, founder of O'Reilly Media
Eric Sink from SourceGear
 Kevin Unangst of Microsoft

Microsoft and Google were the banner sponsors.

2004 
Gnomedex 4.0 (a.k.a. "Geeks Gone Wild") was held from Thursday, September 30 to Monday, October 4, 2004 at Harrah's in Lake Tahoe, Nevada.  Originally, Gnomedex 4.0 was going to be sponsored by Comedy Central and have an open bar.  The theme (and sponsor) changed several times after it was announced.  The keynote was by Steve Wozniak.  Notable speakers and events included Nick Bradbury, Henry Copeland, Dan Gillmor, Ross Rader, Robert Scoble, Jason Shellen, Wil Wheaton and a live broadcast of the Gillmor Gang syndicated technology radio show.  Sponsors included Microsoft, PayPal, Google, AMD, Yahoo! Search, DecisionCast, and ZDNet.

IT Conversations produced podcasts of the sessions, which are still available online.  The podcast of Steve Wozniak's keynote address is one of the all-time most popular audio programs in IT Conversations history.

The published schedule was as follows:
 The Future of Security (panel): Chris DiBona (moderator), Neil Wyler, Fred Felman, CJ Holthaus, Nico Sell, Dan Appleman
 Maximizing Your Blogging Strategies: Adam Kalsey (moderator), Robert Scoble, Nick Bradbury, Ross Rader, Jason Shellen, Dave Taylor
 Keynote Speaker: Steve Wozniak
 Maximizing Your Digital Lifestyle: Eric Rice (moderator), Jim Louderback, Patrick Norton, Ken Layne, Anil Dash, Paul Kent, Tim Handley
 The Future of Online Content: Scott Johnson, Greg Reinacker, Steve Gillmor, Dan Gillmor, Peter Kaminski, Jason Calacanis
 Wil Wheaton
 The Future of Online Advertising: Dave McClure (moderator), Jeff Barr, Henry Copeland, Bill Flitter, Gokul Rajaram

2005 

Gnomedex 5.0 was the first of the series to be held in Seattle, Washington at the Bell Harbor Convention Center. The conference took place from June 23–25, 2005.  Notable presentations and activities included:

 Microsoft announced that RSS feeds would be supported in the next version of Microsoft Windows. They also gave the first public demonstration of Internet Explorer 7, focusing on its RSS features. Attendees received a track jacket from Microsoft with "Browse, Search, Subscribe" and "(Longhorn icon) (heart icon) RSS" patches.
 Adam Curry delivered the closing keynote, while simultaneously recording an episode of his podcast, Daily Source Code.
 Kathy Gill from University of Washington presented on blogging in the classroom
 Julie Leung gave a presentation on personal and public media
 Phillip Torrone of Make Magazine presented on the craft of making
 David Winer sang The Beatles' Yellow Submarine.
 John Furrier of PodTech.net recorded his Infotalk podcast in a closet which included guests Adam Curry, Dean Hachamovitch from Microsoft, Steve Rubel, Matt Mullenweg, Scott Rafer, Mark Fletcher, and other early influencers in blogging and podcasting.
 An episode of the Gillmor Gang podcast was recorded live.

Scheduled speakers and panels were:
 Dave Winer
 Dean Hachamovitch of Microsoft
 Steve Gillmor, Dave Sifry, Scott Gatz on Tomorrow's Syndication
 Kathy Gill, Paul Vogelzang on the Tomorrow's Education
 David Geller, John Battelle, Dan Gillmor on Today's Citizen Media
 Matt Westervelt, Asa Dotzler, Scott Collins, Matt Mullenweg on Tomorrow's Open Source
 Hobie Swan on MindManager
 Julie Leung on Blogging as Social Tool
 Mark Fletcher, Scott Rafer, Bob Wyman on Tomorrow's RSS
 JD Lasica, Terry Heaton, Cory Bergman on Tomorrow's Media
 Steve Rubel, Chris Sloop on Tomorrow's Public Relations
 Denise Howell, Buzz Bruggeman, Jason Calacanis on Today's Digital Legalities
 Adam Curry

A sold-out crowd of over 400 people attended.

2006 

Gnomedex 6.0 was held in Seattle, Washington at the Bell Harbor Convention Center from Thursday June 29 - Saturday, July 1, 2006.  Notable presentations were:

 keynote by Senator John Edwards
 a discussion and demonstration of Pixsy by Chase Norlin
 a demonstration of Melodeo by Bill Valenti and Rob Greenlee

The published roster of discussion leaders was:
 Michael Arrington
 Om Malik
 Dave Dederer
 John Edwards
 Werner Vogels
 Steve Rubel
 Marc Canter
 Susan Mernit
 Jim Lanzone
 Steve Gilmor
 Dave Winer
 Philip "Pud" Kaplan
 Chris Messina
 Ethan Kaplan
 Kaliya Hamlin (audience pick for Gnomedex MVP)
 Halley Suitt
 Blake Ross
 Jeremy Zawondny
 Phil Torrone

A sold-out crowd of over 400 people attended.

2007 
Gnomedex 7.0 was held in Seattle, Washington at the Bell Harbor Convention Center on August 9–11, 2007.

Roster of speakers:
 Robert Steele
 Darren Barefoot
 Guy Kawasaki
 Bad Sinatra Live
 Justin Kan
 Ronni Bennett
 Vanessa Fox
 Jason Calacanis
 Cali Lewis and Neal Campbell
 Michael Linton
 Gregg Spiridellis
 Derek K. Miller (via video link - archived video stream)
 Kathy Gill
 Sterling Allan

Also, a selection of Ignite Seattle!  participants gave a series of 5-minute Pecha Kucha-style presentations.

A sold-out crowd of over 400 people attended.

2008 

Gnomedex 8.0 was held in Seattle, Washington at the Bell Harbor Convention Center on August 21–23, 2008.  The theme for this year's Gnomedex was "Human Circuitry."  Listed below are the speakers, along with videos of their presentation (hosted on YouTube):

 Alex Steffen
 Amanda Koster of SalaamGarage
 Dr. Arvind Krishnamurthy from the University of Washington
 Ben Huh of I Can Has Cheezburger?
 Beth Kanter from Summit Collaborative
 Brady Forrest from O'Reilly Radar
 Danny Sullivan
 Dave Mathews from boxee
 Eric Lin
 Ethan Katz-Basset
 Eve Maler, from Sun Microsystems, discussing managing online relationships
 Francine Hardaway
 Gabriel Maganis
 Jeremy Toeman
 John Malkin
 Josh Bancroft
 Kevin Fox
 Kris Krug on photography (higher quality version of video here )
 Larry Halff from Magnolia
 Mark Bao
 Matt Harding
 Monica Guzman
 Nathan Wade from the University of Washington
 Sara Davies
 Sarah Lacey
 Scott Maxwell from NASA
 Tadayoshi Kohno
 Tara Hunt (presented with Larry Halff from Magnolia)

The main hall was filled to capacity with almost 350 attendees.

Interesting or notable events included:  Dancing with Matt Harding.

Sponsors included Blue Sky Factor, Chevrolet, CNN.com, Design Reactor, General Motors, HP, Mighty Leaf Tea, Pathable, SolarWinds, SnapStream, Sony, TechSmith, Ustream, Viewzi, WeatherBug, and Wetpaint.

Pirillo also announced he was interested in doing three to four smaller one-day events across the United States in 2009, but did not give further details.

2009 
Gnomedex 9.0 was held from Friday, August 21, 2009 to Saturday, August 22, 2009.  Commercial sponsors included Amazon.com, BlogWorld, C-K Graphics, Comcast, CNN.COM,  Digital River, ESET, Griffin, Hawaiian Airlines, Hewlett-Packard, ICanHasCheezBurger, Ipswitch Software, Jinx, Leatherback Printing, Mashable, Microsoft, nPost, PC Pitstop, PCC Natural Markets, PhotoJoJo, Picnik, Ping.fm, ReadWriteWeb, RealNetworks, Seesmic, Shozu, Starbucks, ThrowBoy, Ustream.TV and WeatherBug.  Organizational sponsors included BBJ, BrighterPlanet, the Greater Seattle Chamber of Commerce, Heifer International, Puget Sound Blood Center and Social Media Club Seattle.

Speakers:
 Warren Etheredge on The Art of the Interview 
 Chris Brogan and Julien Smith on the Rise of Trust Agents
 Phil Plait on skepticism
 Christine Peterson from the Foresight Institute on Life Extension of Geeks
 Bre Pettis on Personal Manufacturing: Robots Sharing Built
 Firas Khatib from the University of Washington on Foldit
 Todd Friesen on Confessions of a Retired Spammer
 Brady Forrest
 Drew Olanoff
 Frank Eliason on A Twitter Top-Ten List (with Humor!)
 Mark Glaser
 Jim Ray
 Beth Goza on Nerd Craft: A Field Guide
 Micah Baldwin on Building Influence Online
 Jay Grandin and Leah Nelson on 20,000,000 versus 20
 Angel Djambazov on Amazon, Affiliates & Taxing 
 Mark Horvath
 Amber Case on Prosthetic Culture 
 Kris Krüg, who closed the conference the Gnomedex 9 Photo Awards

2010 

Gnomedex 10 was held Thursday, August 19 through Saturday, August 21, 2010, in Seattle, Washington at the Bell Harbor Conference Center and shared registration with pii2010 as a part of the larger Seattle Geek Week event.

Commercial sponsors included American Public Media, Atlas Networks, Banyan Branch, the Bellevue Business Journal, BlogWorld, Deploy Day, EventBrite, GirlsInTech, GoDaddy, Griffin Technologies, Hotel Max, Hover, IAmEastSide, the Issaquah Press, Jones Soda Company, Mashable, Microsoft, the Modern Media Man Summit, Parallels Holdings, PCC Natural Markets, Pipeline Deals, Pooper Trooper, PopChips, Privacy Identity Innovation, the Public Insight Network, RaceVision, RealNetworks, ReveNews, Seagate, Seattle Net Tuesday, SeattleWineGal, SmartCup, Social Media Club Seattle, SuperAntiSpyware, Swedish Medical Center, UStream.TV, Washington Technology Industry Association, WeatherBug, Yelp and Zing Bars.

The tenth Gnomedex conference had a similar schedule to previous Gnomedexes held at the Bell Harbor Conference Center, starting with registration and then a social mixer for attendees to meet.

Speakers:

 Brian Solis presenting the opening keynote on community
 Trish Millines Dziko from the Technology Access Foundation on providing computer literacy skills to minorities
 Charles Brennick of InterConnection on reusing and recycling computers
 Austin Heap, creator of the Haystack software
 Tom Nugent
 Todd Welch
 Willow Brugh
 Johnny Diggz
 Rob Knop
 Bill Schrier
 Amy Karlson
 Shauna Causey and Melody Biringer
 Larry Wu
 Scott "Spot" Draves of Digital Sheep
 Scott and Alex Mueller of Moosicorn Ranch
 Melissa Pierce
 Violet Blue on sexuality
 Jason Barger
 Steven Fisher and Michael Dougherty
 Tim Hwang
 Matt Inman of The Oatmeal
 Seattle Wine Gal on Wine Tasting How-To's
 OmniTechNews
 Joe Pirillo and Judy Pirillo on 10 Years of Gnomedex

Organizers indicate that the 2010 Gnomedex will likely be the last.

2011 
Gnomedex 2011 was held on Wednesday, November 2, 2011 in Seattle, Washington at the Washington State Convention Center and held in conjunction with Seattle Interactive Conference 2011.

Speakers:

 Marcus Barnes-Cannon from the University of Washington discussed the PROTECT IP Act.
 Libby Tucker discussed how technology could be used to reduce the size of the Great Pacific Garbage Patch (a/k/a "Plastic Island")
 Shawn Ahmed of the Uncultured Project discussed global poverty and shared his own experiences providing aid in Bangladesh in the aftermath of Hurricane Sidr.
 Michael Haley, Ph.D spoke on designing systems to function as desired.
 Chris Burgess of Atigeo discussed cyberbullying in a talk title Unintended Consequences 
 Pascal Schuback of CrisisCommons discussed how technology and open data could be used in crisis management and humanitarian aid to provide realtime data.
 Kent Nichols of AskANinja explained how to find an audience for online video series
 Microsoft's Robotics division gave a demo of Roborazzi, a camera-toting robot for taking pictures at social events.

Chris Pirillo said he was thinking about holding another Gnomedex in 2012 as a standalone event.

References

External links

2001 establishments in Washington (state)
Computer conferences
Culture of Seattle
Recurring events established in 2001
Seattle Area conventions
Technology conferences